Under the Dome is an American science fiction mystery drama television series developed by Brian K. Vaughan and based on the novel of the same name by Stephen King. Under the Dome premiered on CBS on June 24, 2013, and concluded on September 10, 2015. 39 episodes were produced over the show's three-season run.

The series tells the story of the residents of the fictional small town called Chester's Mill, when a massive, transparent, indestructible dome suddenly cuts them off from the rest of the world. Military forces, the government, and the media positioned outside the barrier attempt to break it down, while the residents trapped inside must find their own ways to survive with diminishing resources and rising tensions. A small group of people inside the dome must also unravel complicated mysteries in order to figure out what the dome is, where it came from, and when (and if) it will go away.

Series overview

Episodes

Season 1 (2013)

Season 2 (2014)

Season 3 (2015)

Ratings

References

External links 
 
 
  on The Futon Critic

Lists of American science fiction television series episodes
 
Episodes